Bir Küçük Aşk is İzel's third studio album. All of the lyrics were written by Altan Çetin. "Yok Yere" made a huge success all over Turkey.

Track listing

Credits
Production: Universal Music
Producer: Altan Çetin
Mix: Erekli Tunç
Mastering: Çağlar Türkmen
Photographs: Koray Kasap
Graphic Design: Feridun Ertaşkan
Hair: Cem Doğan 
Make-up: Selda Çakır

Music videos

Charts

References

İzel Çeliköz albums
1999 albums